The Saint-Vincent Gate (Porte Saint-Vincent) is a former city gate in Vannes, Brittany, France. It is listed in the Base Mérimée as a historic monument.

Gallery

References

Bibliography

  Olivier Furon, Collection Mémoire en Images, éditions Alain Sutton, Vannes, 1995.

Infrastructure completed in the 17th century
Buildings and structures in Morbihan
Vannes
Monuments historiques of Morbihan